Agathia obsoleta is a species of moth in the family Geometridae first described by William Warren in 1897. It is found in Java, Sumatra, Borneo and the Philippines. A. obsoleta is a rare species of lowland forests, including heath forest.

Subspecies
Agathia obsoleta obsoleta
Agathia obsoleta olivacea Warren, 1905  = Agathia olivacea Warren, 1905

References

External links

Geometrinae
Moths of Asia
Moths described in 1897